Gloeokinium viscum is a dinoflagellate symbiont of Millepora dichotoma.

References

Further reading

Protists described in 1995
Dinoflagellate species
Dinophyceae